Andy Janovich (born May 23, 1993) is an American football fullback who is a free agent. He played college football at Nebraska, and was selected in the sixth round of the 2016 NFL Draft by the Denver Broncos. He has also played for the Cleveland Browns.

Early years
Janovich attended and played high school football at Gretna High School.

College career
Janovich played college football at Nebraska, where he spent the majority of his playing time on special teams and alternating at fullback with C. J. Zimmerer, primarily in blocking roles. His touches were few and far between until the 2015 season, where he was fourth in total rushing yards with 265 rushing yards (6.3 YPC), 3 rushing touchdowns, and two receptions for 58 yards; he also led the team on special teams tackles with 13 (11 solo).

Professional career
Janovich was one of four Nebraska Cornhuskers and one of five fullbacks to attend the NFL Scouting Combine in Indianapolis, Indiana. He tied Northwestern's Dan Vitale for first in the bench press among all running backs. On March 4, 2016, he participated at Nebraska's pro day, but opted to not perform drills and only meet with team representatives and scouts. At the conclusion of the pre-draft process, Janovich was projected to be a seventh round pick or a priority undrafted free agent. He was ranked as the seventh best fullback in the draft by NFLDraftScout.com.

Denver Broncos
The Denver Broncos selected Janovich in the sixth round (176th overall) of the 2016 NFL Draft. He was the first of three fullbacks selected in 2016.

2016
On May 13, 2016, the Denver Broncos signed Janovich to a four-year, $2.5 million contract that includes a signing bonus of $164,309.

Throughout training camp, he competed against veteran Juwan Thompson for the starting fullback position. He made his professional regular season debut in the Denver Broncos' season-opener against the Carolina Panthers and scored a 28-yard touchdown on his first career carry during the 21–20 victory. On September 25, 2016, he earned his first career start and had one carry for two-yards during a 29–17 victory over the Cincinnati Bengals. On November 30, 2016, Janovich was placed on injured reserve after having ankle surgery. He finished the  season with four carries for 33 rushing yards in 11 games and five starts.

2017
Janovich entered the 2017 season slated as the starting fullback under new head coach Vance Joseph.

On October 22, 2017, Janovich had one carry for a three-yard gain and caught the first two passes of his career for 14 yards during a 21–0 loss to the Los Angeles Chargers. On December 10, 2017, he scored a one-yard rushing touchdown in the Broncos' 23–0 win over the New York Jets. In the 2017 season, he finished with six carries for 12 rushing yards and a rushing touchdown to go along with four receptions for 35 receiving yards.

2018
In 2018, Janovich played all 16 games (7 starts), recording eight receptions for 112 yards with one touchdown and rushing twice for five yards. On December 30, 2018, Janovich caught his first career receiving touchdown on a 20-yard pass from quarterback Case Keenum in a loss to the Los Angeles Chargers.

2019
On October 11, 2019, Janovich signed a three-year, $5.7 million contract extension with the Broncos. In Week 11, Janovich suffered a gruesome dislocated elbow injury and was ruled out for the rest of the year. He was placed on injured reserve on November 19. He appeared in seven games and recorded five receptions for 42 receiving yards and had one rushing touchdown.

Cleveland Browns
Janovich was traded to the Cleveland Browns on March 20, 2020, in exchange for the Browns' seventh-round pick in the 2021 NFL Draft. He was placed on the reserve/COVID-19 list by the team on November 16, 2020, and activated on November 30.

On October 12, 2021, Janovich was placed on injured reserve. He was activated on November 6.

Houston Texans
On March 25, 2022, Janovich signed with the Houston Texans. He was released on August 21, 2022.

Personal life
Janovich is the son of Ron and Brenda Janovich. He was raised in Gretna, Nebraska and attended Gretna High School, where he starred in football and wrestling. In 2010-2011, Janovich won the Nebraska Class B 189-pound title, with a 53-0 record. In 2011-2012, Janovich won the 220-pound title, finishing at 46-0. Andy is of Lithuanian, German, and Irish descent.
Andy married his college sweetheart, Madison McConkey, in February 2018.

References

External links
Denver Broncos bio
Nebraska Cornhuskers bio

1993 births
Living people
American football fullbacks
Players of American football from Nebraska
People from Sarpy County, Nebraska
Nebraska Cornhuskers football players
Denver Broncos players
Cleveland Browns players
Houston Texans players
Ed Block Courage Award recipients